Claude Charles McColloch (January 14, 1888 – September 30, 1959) was a member of the Oregon State Senate and later a United States district judge of the United States District Court for the District of Oregon.

Education and career

McColloch was born in Red Bluff, California, to Mary Elizabeth McColloch (née Wooddy) and her husband Charles Henry McColloch on January 14, 1888. When McColloch was two years old, the family relocated to Oregon, where he received his education through high school in Portland. McColloch entered Stanford University in Palo Alto, California, in 1904 and attended until 1907, when he left for the University of Chicago Law School. He graduated from law school in 1909, with a Bachelor of Philosophy degree and was admitted to the Oregon bar in May of that year. Returning to Oregon, he began private legal practice in Eastern Oregon in Baker City. McColloch remained in Baker until 1913, and served in the Oregon State Senate after winning election to a four-year term in 1910. A Democrat, he represented Baker County. In 1913, he returned to Portland where he remained in private practice until 1926. While in Portland, he served on the Port of Portland commission from 1922 to 1924. In 1926, McColloch moved to Southern Oregon where he set up private practice in Klamath Falls. He remained in that city until 1937, and served as chairman of Oregon's Democratic Party in 1936.

Federal judicial service

On August 5, 1937, President Franklin D. Roosevelt nominated McColloch for a position on the United States District Court for the District of Oregon to replace the deceased Judge John Hugh McNary. McColloch was confirmed by the United States Senate on August 17, 1937, and joined the Portland-based court on August 20, 1937, after receiving his commission. He served as Chief Judge from 1954 to 1958. He took senior status on December 31, 1958. McColloch died on September 30, 1959.

References

1888 births
1959 deaths
Judges of the United States District Court for the District of Oregon
United States district court judges appointed by Franklin D. Roosevelt
20th-century American judges
Lawyers from Portland, Oregon
Politicians from Klamath Falls, Oregon
Democratic Party Oregon state senators
University of Chicago alumni
Stanford University alumni
People from Red Bluff, California
Democratic Party of Oregon chairs
Politicians from Baker City, Oregon